Matia Mahal Assembly constituency is one of the seventy Delhi assembly constituencies of Delhi in northern India.
Matia Mahal assembly constituency is a part of Chandni Chowk (Lok Sabha constituency).

Electoral History
The constituency was created in 1993 after abolition of Metropolitan Council. Since then, it has been represented by Shoaib Iqbal who contested the seats 7 times from different parties. However, during 2015 Delhi Legislative Assembly election, he contested from Indian National Congress and lost to Asim Ahmed Khan by a huge margin. 

After the reunification of three municipal corporations into Municipal Corporation of Delhi, the Constituency was divided into 3 wards - Chandni Mahal, Sita Ram Bazaar and Delhi Gate.The constituency has 3 wards under it each represented by a Councillor. 

 Chandni Mahal - Aaley Muhammad Iqbal (AAP)
 Delhi Gate -  Kiran Rakesh Kumar (AAP)
 Bazar Sita Ram -  Rafia Mahir (AAP)

Members of Legislative Assembly
Key

Election results

2020

2015

2013

2008

2003

1998

1993

References

Assembly constituencies of Delhi
Delhi Legislative Assembly